Menudo can refer to:
 Menudo (group), Puerto Rican boy band
 Menudo (album), a 1985 album by the band
 Menudo: La Película, a 1982 film featuring the band
 Menudo: La Reunion, a 2005 music project composed of former band members 
 Menudo (soup), traditional Mexican soup
 Menudo (stew), Filipino meat stew
 Menudo Mix, a 2004 mixtape

See also